The Shant Alliance Nationalist Party, also known as the Shant Alliance is an Armenian political party.

History
The Shant Alliance Nationalist Party was founded in 2021 by Shahen Harutyunyan, the son of Shant Harutyunyan, a Soviet-era political dissident. The party participated in municipal elections in November 2021. The party decided to run only in certain communities within the Syunik Province. The incumbent mayor of Kapan (Syunik's regional capital), Gevorg Parsyan, led the Shant Alliance's electoral list. In the town of Tatev, the party won 6 seats in the municipal council. On 11 November 2021, the Shant Alliance signed a memorandum of cooperation with the Country of Living party. Both parties agreed to form a coalition in order to form a majority in the Tatev city council. Both parties agreed to elect their representative for mayor. Prior to the local elections, the party ruled out forming any alliance with the Civil Contract party.

Ideology
The party supports increasing security and territorial integrity of the Syunik Province, tackling poverty, creating new jobs, supporting educational and social programs, and providing greater support to families.

See also

 Programs of political parties in Armenia

References

External links 
 Shant Alliance Nationalist Party on Facebook

Political parties established in 2021
Political parties in Armenia